is a former Japanese football player. He played for the Japan national team.

Club career
Fujishiro was born in Chiba Prefecture on January 25, 1960. After graduating from Juntendo University, he joined Nippon Kokan (later NKK SC) in 1982. Starting in 1985, the club won second place for three years in a row. The club also won the 1987 JSL Cup. He left the club in 1991 and joined Sumitomo Metal in 1992. He retired in 1992.

National team career
On January 27, 1988, Fujishiro debuted for the Japan national team against the United Arab Emirates. He played two games for Japan in 1988.

Club statistics

National team statistics

References

External links

Japan National Football Team Database

1960 births
Living people
Juntendo University alumni
Association football people from Chiba Prefecture
Japanese footballers
Japan international footballers
Japan Soccer League players
NKK SC players
Kashima Antlers players
Association football midfielders